The 1983 Appalachian State Mountaineers football team was an American football team that represented Appalachian State University as a member of the Southern Conference (SoCon) during the 1983 NCAA Division I-AA football season. In their only year under head coach Mack Brown, the Mountaineers compiled an overall record of 6–5 with a mark of 4–5 in conference play, placing fourth in the SoCon.

Schedule

References

Appalachian State
Appalachian State Mountaineers football seasons
Appalachian State Mountaineers football